Škoda Ice Hall (before 2013 Premia Ice Hall) is an ice arena in Tallinn, Estonia.

The hall was opened in winter 2002.

The hall has two ice arenas with dimensions of 28 x 58 m.

The hall is used by the following ice hockey clubs: HC Panter, HC Purikad Tallinn and HC Tallinn. Several Meistriliiga games have taken place in the hall.

References

External links
 

Indoor arenas in Estonia
Sports venues in Tallinn
Indoor ice hockey venues in Estonia
2002 establishments in Estonia
Sports venues completed in 2002